Port Dickson is a federal constituency in Port Dickson District, Negeri Sembilan, Malaysia that is represented in the Dewan Rakyat from 1959 to 1974 and from 2018 to present.

The federal constituency was created in the 1958 redistribution, but it was abolished in the 1974 redistribution. However in 2018 the Port Dickson federal constituency was re-created and replaced the Telok Kemang federal constituency following the 2018 redelineation and is mandated to return a single member to the Dewan Rakyat under the first past the post voting system.

Demographics

History

Polling districts
According to the gazette issued on 31 October 2022, the Port Dickson constituency has a total of 32 polling districts.

Representation history

State constituency

Current state assembly members

Local governments

Election results

References

Negeri Sembilan federal constituencies